Suddha can refer to:

Suddha (film), a 2005 Indian film
Śuddha, a Sanskrit term referring to purity in Buddhism
Śuddha, pure tattvas in Śaivism